Sergey Pakura (born May 3, 1983) is a Kyrgyzstani middle distance runner. Pakura represented Kyrgyzstan at the 2008 Summer Olympics in Beijing, where he competed for the men's 800 metres. He ran in the seventh heat, against six other athletes including American middle-distance runner Andrew Wheating, and Robert Lathouwers of the Netherlands. He finished the race in last place by two seconds behind Jamaica's Aldwyn Sappleton, with a time of 1:50.54. Pakura, however, failed to advance into the semi-finals, as he placed fifty-second overall, and was ranked farther below two mandatory slots for the next round.

Competition record

References

External links
 
NBC 2008 Olympics profile

Kyrgyzstani male middle-distance runners
Living people
Olympic athletes of Kyrgyzstan
Athletes (track and field) at the 2008 Summer Olympics
1983 births
Kyrgyzstani people of Russian descent
Athletes (track and field) at the 2006 Asian Games
Athletes (track and field) at the 2010 Asian Games
Asian Games competitors for Kyrgyzstan